The Henry Schmieder Arboretum (60 acres) is an arboretum and collection of gardens located across the campus of Delaware Valley College, Doylestown, Pennsylvania. It is open daily without charge.

The arboretum's tree and garden collections include:

 1920s Cottage Garden
 Beech Collection
 Bieberfeld Oak Woods
 Gazebo Annuals Garden
 John Herbst Winter Walk
 Hillman Family Garden
 Iris and Peony Garden (redesigned in 2004-05)
 Lois Burpee Herb Garden
 Martin Brooks Conifer Collection
 Rose Garden (redesigned in 2003)
 Rock Garden
 Woodland Walk

Other trees on the campus include Cladrastis kentukea, Fraxinus Americana, Gleditsia triacanthos inermis, Quercus phellos, etc.

See also 

 List of botanical gardens in the United States

References

 Schlereth, Thomas J., "Early North American Arboreta", Garden History,  Vol. 35, Supplement: Cultural and Historical Geographies of the Arboretum (2007), pp. 196–216.

External links 

Arboreta in Pennsylvania
Botanical gardens in Pennsylvania
Parks in Bucks County, Pennsylvania